Prime Minister Mackenzie may refer to,

Alexander Mackenzie, Prime Minister of Canada (1873-78)
Thomas Mackenzie, Prime Minister of New Zealand (1912)
William Lyon Mackenzie King, Prime Minister of Canada (1921-26)